The 1982 European Super Cup was contested between the European Cup holders Aston Villa and the Cup Winners' Cup holders Barcelona. The match took place over two legs in January 1983. The first leg was won by Barcelona 1–0 at the Camp Nou stadium in Barcelona, but Aston Villa won 3–0 at Villa Park after extra time to take a 3–1 aggregate win.

Details

First leg

Second leg

See also
1982 European Cup Final
1982 European Cup Winners' Cup Final
1982–83 Aston Villa F.C. season
1982–83 FC Barcelona season
FC Barcelona in international football

References

External links
UEFA webpage about the game

Super Cup

1982
Super Cup 1982
Super Cup 1982
International club association football competitions hosted by Spain
International club association football competitions hosted by England
Supercup
Supercup
January 1983 sports events in Europe
1983 in Catalonia
1980s in Barcelona
Sports competitions in Barcelona
1980s in Birmingham, West Midlands